Chhoti Bahoo [English: Youngest Daughter-in-law] is a 1994 Hindi family drama film directed by M. M. Baig. The film stars Deepak Tijori and Shilpa Shirodkar in the lead roles. The film was a remake of Bengali film Choto Bou.

Soundtrack
All songs were written by Sameer and composed by Nadeem-Shravan.

References

External links 
 
 
 Chhoti Bahoo music at Saavn

1994 films
Films scored by Nadeem–Shravan
1990s Hindi-language films
1994 drama films
Hindi remakes of Bengali films